Jell-O 1-2-3 was a Jell-O gelatin product introduced in 1969 and discontinued in 1996. The product was one 4.3 ounce (121 g) powdered mix that, when properly prepared, separated and solidified into three distinct layers: a creamy top, a mousse-like middle, and regular Jell-O bottom.

In popular culture 
In season 1, episode 16 of the TV show The Nanny, Fran's mother prepared Jell-O 1-2-3 for her and the Sheffields. Fran notes that it hasn't been produced in a long time, and her mother claims she's been saving it for a "special occasion".
In season 1, episode 3 of the TV show The Kids in the Hall, Fran (Scott's character) mentions Jell-O 1-2-3 at the end of the "Salty Ham" skit.
In the episode "The Lost Art of Forehead Sweat" of the TV show The X-Files, Agent Scully remembers having it at family celebrations, but misremembers it as "Goop-O A-B-C" due to the Mandela effect.

References 

Brand name desserts